Anand Prithviraj Singh is an Indian politician who is currently serving as Minister of Tourism, Ecology and Environment of Karnataka since 4 August 2021. He was the Minister of Infrastructure development, Hajj & Waqf Department of Karnataka from 10 February 2021 to 26 July 2021.  He is a Member of the Karnataka Legislative Assembly from Vijayanagara constituency from 16 May 2018.

He was the Tourism minister in the Government of Karnataka and for the fourth time he was elected as a member of the Karnataka Legislative Assembly. He was one of the 17 members to resign and the reason for the downfall of the coalition  government of Karnataka in 2019. He then joined the BJP and contested the by-elections. He has been elected for the Fourth consecutive time as MLA from Vijayanagara (Hospet) constituency in 2019 state by-elections. He is considered as the powerful leader of the state and also involved in mining business and he has assets more than thousands of crores rupees. He was then inducted into the Fourth B. S. Yeddyurappa ministry.
He is one of the richest politicians in India.

Career
He represents the Vijayanagara constituency as a member of the Bharatiya Janata Party.

In 2015, Singh was arrested in the Belekeri iron ore scam. He was later released on bail.

Controversies

Accused of forest encroachment and illegal mining
Anand Singh has 15 criminal cases against him, and is facing 3 CBI trials about encroachment and illegal mining. After joining the BJP and forming the government he was given the forest department portfolio to serve as a cabinet minister. This was criticized by the opposition and the media, calling it an act to hush up the criminal cases by means of his cabinet powers. They also insisted on changing his portfolio so that the enquiry is not affected.

References

External links 
 Karnataka Legislative Assembly

Living people
Bharatiya Janata Party politicians from Karnataka
Karnataka MLAs 2008–2013
Karnataka MLAs 2018–2023
1966 births
Karnataka MLAs 2013–2018